Joyce Auguste was a Saint Lucian musician and leader of The Hewanorra Voices, which became a major popular folk band in the 1970s.  Auguste also worked as music supervisor for the Saint Lucian school system and introduced folk music into the school curriculum.

References

Year of birth missing (living people)
Living people
Saint Lucian musicians